Jack Raymond (April 23, 1914 – January 30, 1975) was an American radio host who was active from the late 1930s until his death in 1975.

As a young man, Raymond briefly attended seminary. At one point, he was engaged to four different women at the same time.

During his career in broadcasting, Raymond's most popular shows were "Worth Listening To" (1943-1955 on WISN) and "The Jack Raymond Show" (1957-1975 on fifty stations across the United States). Raymond was also the news commentator for "News of the World" and a narrator on "Family Theater." During his career he worked at many Milwaukee radio stations including WISN, WFOX, WEMP, WRIT, and WYLO. In the 1930s he also worked at WGN in Chicago and WIBU. 

Raymond died in 1975 from a heart attack. The Jack Raymond Show currently airs at noon and from 11:00-midnight on WCFW and has gained a resurgence in popularity and a cult following. Raymond was the subject of a documentary titled Silently Steal Away which premiered at the Eaux Claires Festival and Wisconsin Film Festival.

References 

1914 births
1975 deaths
American talk radio hosts
Radio personalities from Chicago
Radio personalities from Milwaukee
Radio pioneers
Writers from Milwaukee